Emirates NBD Bank PJSC is Dubai's government-owned bank and is one of the largest banking groups in the Middle East in terms of assets.

History and profile
Emirates NBD was initially formed as National Bank of Dubai (NBD) on 19 June 1963 by then Dubai's ruler Sheikh Rashid bin Saeed Al Maktoum, forming the first national bank established in Dubai. NBD merged with Emirates Bank International (EBI) on 6 March 2007, to form Emirates NBD. On 16 October 2007, the shares of Emirates NBD were officially listed on the Dubai Financial Market (DFM).

On 1 December 2012 Dubai Bank was acquired by Emirates NDB.

As of 31 December 2020, total assets were AED 698 billion, deposits of AED 464 billion, the total income of AED 23.21 billion, and a net profit of AED 7 billion. The Group has operations in the UAE, Egypt, India, Saudi Arabia, Singapore, the United Kingdom, and representative offices in China and Indonesia.

On October 7, 2022, Emirates NBD Bank PJSC sold 86,316,964 ordinary shares of BankIslami Pakistan Limited to JS Bank Limited.

Currently, more than 9,000 people, representing 70 nationalities, are employed by Emirates NBD, making it one of the largest employers in the UAE.

Emirates NBD, has announced its plans for further expansion in India, following approval from the Reserve Bank of India (RBI) to open two additional branches in Gurugram and Chennai to cater to both the northern and southern markets of India.

Emirates NBD Group companies

 Emirates NBD Bank PJSC 
 Emirates Islamic PJSC
 Emirates NBD Asset Management
 Emirates NBD Securities
 Network International LLC (49% sold to AbrCapital in 2010), credit and debit Card Issuing & Processing company.
 ETFS LLC
 Emirates NBD Capital Ltd (DIFC)
 Emirates NBD Trust Company Ltd (Jersey)
 Emirates NBD Capital LLC (KSA)
 Tanfeeth
 Liv. (Digital banking)

Associate companies
 ENBD REIT

See also 

 Islamic banking
 Noor Bank
 List of banks in the United Arab Emirates

References

External links

Emirates Islamic

Banks established in 1963
Companies listed on the Dubai Financial Market
Banks of the United Arab Emirates
Emirati companies established in 1963
Emirati companies established in 2007
Banks established in 2007